Polonuevo is a municipality and town in the Colombian department of Atlántico.

References

External links
 Gobernacion del Atlantico - Polonuevo
 Polonuevo official website

Municipalities of Atlántico Department